The men's hammer throw event at the 1958 British Empire and Commonwealth Games was held on 26 July at the Cardiff Arms Park in Cardiff, Wales.

Results

References

Athletics at the 1958 British Empire and Commonwealth Games
1958